Syngonanthus yacuambensis is a species of plant in the Eriocaulaceae family. It is endemic to Ecuador. Its natural habitats are subtropical or tropical moist montane forests and subtropical or tropical high-altitude shrubland.

References

Eriocaulaceae
Endemic flora of Ecuador
Vulnerable plants
Taxonomy articles created by Polbot